Bishop Francis Serrao, S.J. is the current serving Bishop of the Roman Catholic Diocese of Shimoga, India.

Early life and education 
Francis was born on 15 August 1959 in Moodabidri, Karnataka, India to Late Mr. Piedade Serrao and Mrs. Gracy Mary Serrao. he Masters in Theology from Vidyajyoti College of Theology, New Delhi.

Priesthood 
Francis joined Society of Jesus in year 1979. He completed his philosophy and theology at the Jnana-Deepa Vidyapeeth, Pune. He was Ordained a Catholic Priest for the Society of Jesus on 30 April 1992. He served as a Rector of St. Aloysius College (Mangalore). He has served as a Superior of the Jesuit Mission in Bajapur and Provincial Superior of Karnataka Jesuit Province.

Episcopate 
Francis was Appointed Bishop of Shimoga, India on 19 March 2014 by Pope Francis and Ordained on 7 May 2014 by Salvatore Pennacchio.

References 

Living people
21st-century Roman Catholic bishops in India
1959 births
20th-century Indian Jesuits
Jesuit bishops
Bishops appointed by Pope Francis
People from Dakshina Kannada district
21st-century Indian Jesuits